Charles Edward Bateman FRIBA (8 June 1863 – 5 August 1947) was an English architect, known for his Arts and Crafts and Queen Anne-style houses and commercial buildings in the Birmingham area and for his sensitive vernacular restoration and extension work in the Cotswolds.

Life and career 
Bateman was born in Castle Bromwich, the son of architect John Jones Bateman, and educated in London and Eastbourne. In 1880 he was articled as a trainee in his father's practice before spending two years in the offices of London architects Verity and Hunt. Verity and Hunt also had offices in Evesham, and it was while working here that he developed an interest in the traditional vernacular architecture of the South Midlands that was to be a lifelong preoccupation.

On returning to Birmingham as a qualified architect in 1887, Bateman entered into partnership with his father as Bateman and Bateman. As part of a well-established practice work was readily available, and he was able to move away from the gothic styles of his father towards a style that incorporated both the simplicity of the Arts and Crafts movement and the late English Renaissance styles of Richard Norman Shaw.

Bateman was an early pioneer of the Arts and Crafts style in Birmingham and built a series of large suburban properties, with particular concentrations in King's Heath, Four Oaks and his native Castle Bromwich, along with more urban offices, factories and townhouses in Birmingham City Centre. His love of the Cotswolds also led to a reputation for the sensitive design of country houses and series of projects  conserving significant historic Cotswold structures such as the Lygon Arms in Broadway.

Bateman became a pillar of Birmingham's architectural establishment. Elected a fellow of the Royal Institute of British Architects in 1898 he went on to serve three terms as President of the Birmingham Architectural Association (which had been founded by his father) and become a senior lecturer in architecture at the Birmingham School of Art. He was also a major figure in local Freemasonry, becoming Provincial Grand Deacon of the Province of Warwickshire.

Bateman died in 1947 in retirement in Bourton-on-the-Hill.

Major built works 
4 and 6, Stanley Road, King's Heath, Birmingham 1894-95
254, Vicarage Road and 2 Cartland Road, King's Heath, Birmingham 1895 (Illustrated in Das englische Haus by H Muthesius)
The Homestead, 25 Woodbourne Road, Edgbaston, Birmingham 1897 (Listed Grade I)
Birmingham and District Bank, 78 and 79 Broad Street, Birmingham 1898
George Jones and Sons Printworks, Cornwall Street, Birmingham 1899 (Demolished)
12 Mulroy Road, Birmingham ca. 1900
Carhampton House, 11, Luttrell Road, Birmingham 1901-02
Town Hall, Queen Victoria Road, Wycombe 1903-04 (with Alfred Hale)
89 & 91 Cornwall street, Birmingham 1904 (Listed Grade II*)
The Red Lion public house, Vicarage Road, King's Heath, Birmingham 1905 (Listed Grade II)
St James' Church, Mere Green Road, Birmingham 1906-08 East end.
Lygon Arms Hotel, Broadway 1910 extensions
The Rectory, Rectory Lane, Castle Bromwich 1911
Millbrick and Burnham, Rectory Lane, Castle Bromwich ( built for himself and his father ) 1896
Vicarage, St James' Church, Edgbaston 1911-12
Vicarage, St Peter's Church, Maney Hill Road, Sutton Coldfield, Birmingham 1911-12
Northfield Library 1914
Lichfield War Memorial, Staffordshire, 1920, Listed Grade II*  
Moreton-in-Marsh Cottage Hospital 1925 extensions
St Chad's Church, Walmley 1925-27
National Provincial Bank, Bennetts Hill, Birmingham 1927 addition of two bays
St Agnes' Church, Moseley 1931-32 tower
Birmingham Law Society, 8 Temple Street, Birmingham 1933
Cleeve House, Cleeve Prior, Worcestershire for William Heaton, 1933

References 

Fellows of the Royal Institute of British Architects
People from Castle Bromwich
1863 births
1947 deaths
Architects from Birmingham, West Midlands